Eldridge is a city in Scott County, Iowa, United States. The population was 6,726 in the 2020 Census; Eldridge is a suburb and part of the Quad Cities metropolitan area.

History
Jacob M. Eldridge, the city's namesake, arrived in central Scott County in 1846, having purchased land for $1.25 per acre. Immigrants from Germany soon followed, and northern Scott County slowly began to develop. Railroads were developed during the 1860s, bringing more settlers. Eldridge Junction, built on land donated by Jacob Eldridge, was incorporated on July 2, 1871. A post office and a Presbyterian church were soon built.

Eldridge faced several challenges during its early years. The railroad faltered financially during the 1880s and was re-located to Oxford Junction, while a smallpox epidemic several years later was said to have totally isolated the city. A fire heavily damaged the city's business district in 1904, and in 1918 a tornado of unknown strength heavily damaged or destroyed several residences and the church, and killed three people. Each time, the city recovered, and the farming community maintained its status as a grain and livestock shipping center.

The city began growing in population during the 1950s, starting with the formation of the Scott County Library System (a countywide network of libraries serving smaller communities in the area) in 1950, and the North Scott Community School District in 1956. By the late 1960s, the population had grown to more than 1,000 residents, and with the creation of several industrial parks to encourage new business development, the city continued to grow.

Geography
Eldridge is located at  (41.648697, −90.581492). It is located north of Davenport along U.S. Route 61.

Demographics

2010 census
As of the census of 2010, there were 5,651 people, 2,213 households, and 1,576 families living in the city. The racial makeup of the city was 96.8% White, 0.5% African American, 0.2% Native American, 0.5% Asian, 0.3% from other races, and 1.8% from two or more races. Hispanic or Latino of any race were 2.1% of the population.

There were 2,213 households, of which 39.1% had children under the age of 18 living with them, 58.2% were married couples living together, 9.9% had a female householder with no husband present, 3.1% had a male householder with no wife present, and 28.8% were non-families. 24.7% of all households were made up of individuals, and 8.6% had someone living alone who was 65 years of age or older. The average household size was 2.55 and the average family size was 3.07.

The median age in the city was 36.7 years. 28.8% of residents were under the age of 18; 6.3% were between the ages of 18 and 24; 27.4% were from 25 to 44; 26.4% were from 45 to 64; and 11.1% were 65 years of age or older. The gender makeup of the city was 48.0% male and 52.0% female.

2000 census
As of the census of 2000, there were 4,159 people, 1,501 households, and 1,179 families living in the city. The racial makeup of the city was 98.58% White, 0.24% African American, 0.05% Native American, 0.22% Asian, 0.17% from other races, and 0.75% from two or more races. Hispanic or Latino of any race were 1.61% of the population.

There were 1,501 households, out of which 44.3% had children under the age of 18 living with them, 64.8% were married couples living together, 11.3% had a female householder with no husband present, and 21.4% were non-families. 18.0% of all households were made up of individuals, and 5.5% had someone living alone who was 65 years of age or older. The average household size was 2.77 and the average family size was 3.15.

31.5% are under the age of 18, 7.0% from 18 to 24, 30.2% from 25 to 44, 23.8% from 45 to 64, and 7.5% who were 65 years of age or older. The median age was 35 years. For every 100 females, there were 94.1 males. For every 100 females age 18 and over, there were 92.0 males.

The median income for a household in the city was $54,167, and the median income for a family was $62,401. Males had a median income of $45,407 versus $23,285 for females. The per capita income for the city was $21,514. About 3.2% of families and 4.5% of the population were below the poverty line, including 7.8% of those under age 18 and none of those age 65 or over.

Government
Eldridge has a mayor-council form of government with a mayor and five city council members. All council members are at-large. City council meetings are conducted bi-monthly on the first and third Mondays of each month at the Eldridge Community Center. The city is managed by a city administrator.

Education
Eldridge hosts three of the seven public schools in the North Scott Community School District, which has its administrative offices there as well. The North Scott High School, North Scott Junior High and Ed White Elementary School are in Eldridge. The other four elementary schools in the district are in the outlying communities of Donahue, Long Grove, Park View and Princeton.

Residents are represented by a seven-member board of education, which conducts bi-monthly meetings on the second and fourth Mondays of each month at the Administration Center.

Popular culture
In Promised Land (2012 film), Matt Damon's character, Steve Butler, is notably from the area of Eldridge, Iowa.

Notable people

Beth Bader (born 1973), member of the LPGA
Kari Lake (born 1969), 2022 Republican nominee for Arizona Governor, graduate of North Scott High School in Eldridge.

References

External links

 
City of Eldridge
City-Data Comprehensive statistical data and more about Eldridge

Cities in Iowa
Cities in the Quad Cities
Cities in Scott County, Iowa
1871 establishments in Iowa